Program Executive Office Soldier is a US Army organization that is responsible for rapid prototyping, procurement, and fielding of equipment for its soldiers.

Development areas
Project Manager Soldier Protection and Individual Equipment (PM SPIE) develops and fields advanced Soldier protection products, comfortable uniforms to enhance mission effectiveness, and improved parachute systems. 
Product Manager Soldier Protective Equipment (PdM SPE) develops and fields force protection equipment that defeats ballistic and fragmentation threats in theater. PM SPE provides body armor, helmets, and other gear that reduce the threat of serious injury.
Product Manager Soldier Clothing and Individual Equipment (PdM SCIE) supports soldiers in operational environments by providing safe, durable, and operationally effective individual and unit equipment. PM SCIE enhances survivability through technologically advanced tactical and environmental protective clothing, individual chemical protective gear, and personnel parachutes and other airdrop equipment.
Project Manager Soldier Lethality (PM SL) supports soldiers through enhancement of current systems and development of next-generation weapons technology. It focuses on ensuring soldiers are equipped with world-class weapon systems, ammunition, and associated target acquisition and fire-control products today and in the future.
Product Manager Crew Served Weapons (PdM CSW) is responsible for research and development of current and future light to heavy machine guns, grenade launchers, small arms ammunition, remote weapons stations, and related target acquisition/fire control products.
Product Manager Individual Weapons (PdM IW) is responsible for research and development of current rifles, carbines, pistols, shotguns, grenade launchers, small arms ammunition, and related target acquisition/fire control products.
Product Manager Next Generation Weapons (PdM NGW) is responsible for research and development of future squad-level weapons, ammunition, and related target acquisition/fire control products.
Project Manager Soldier Sensors and Lasers (PM SSL) provides soldiers with improved lethality, mobility, and survivability in all weather and visibility conditions. Soldier-borne sensors and lasers enhance a soldier's ability to see in all battlefield and lighting conditions, to acquire objects of military significance before detection and to target threat objects accurately for engagement by soldiers or guided munitions. These systems provide critical, on-the-ground direct support to U.S. forces.
Product Manager Soldier Maneuver Sensors (PdM SMS) provides soldiers with products for enhanced vision, improved targeting, and greater lethality.
Product Manager Soldier Precision Targeting Devices (PdM SPTD) develops and fields systems that accurately locate and designate targets for engagement with precision munitions.
Project Manager Soldier Warrior (PM SWAR) supports soldiers through the acquisition of integrated Soldier system. Current systems include Land Warrior, Ground Soldier, Mounted Soldier, and Air Warrior. PM SWAR develops and integrates components into complete systems designed to increase combat effectiveness, decrease combat load, and improve mission flexibility.
Product Manager Air Warrior (PdM AW) integrates all aviation life support and mission equipment into an ensemble that improves the combat effectiveness of the Army aircrew member. This system leverages several joint service technology efforts to create a modular system that increases situational awareness and freedom of movement at the flight controls, enhances mobility to safely operate aircraft systems, reduces physiological stress, facilitates aircraft entry and exit, and provides survival gear in the event of a downed aircraft over land or water.
Product Manager Ground Soldier (PdM GS) provides unprecedented situational awareness and battle command through the current system called Land Warrior (LW) and the future system Ground Soldier Ensemble (GSE). Digital imagery and GPS locations provided by LW/GSE enable thorough mission planning, ramp-side convoy briefings, and on-the-fly changes during missions for high-value targets (HVTs). LW/GSE allows teams, squads, and platoons to pinpoint the location of improvised explosive devices (IEDs), cells, or HVTs with improved speed and precision. LW/GSE enhances dismounted Soldiers survivability by rapidly disseminating locations of suspected enemy IEDs and snipers. LW/GSE also helps prevent fratricide by providing locations of mounted forces and dismounted Soldiers.
Product Director Soldier Systems Integration (PdD SSI) provides cross-product Soldier hardware systems integration support to enable the PEO at the enterprise level to visualize, understand, and deliberately evolve the Soldier system into a mission-tailorable set of capability modules that function as a seamless, integrated suite and to memorialize the results of a deliberate, collaborative Systems Engineering process. Product Director SSI oversees the Tactical Communication and Protective System (TCAPS) program, the Soldier Power program, and administers the Soldier Enhancement Program (SEP) on behalf of PEO Soldier. "The mission of SEP is to identify and evaluate commercial-off-the-shelf (COTS), government-off-the-shelf (GOTS), non-developmental items (NDI) individual weapons, munitions, optics, combat clothing, individual equipment, water supply, shelters, communication and navigational aids which can be adopted and provided to Soldiers."

References

External links
PEO Soldier website
Soldier Enhancement Program

 
Military acquisition